The Nigeria women's cricket team toured Rwanda in September 2019 to play a five-match Women's Twenty20 International (WT20I) series. The two teams had previously played a five-match series in Abuja, Nigeria in January 2019, with Nigeria winning 3–2. This return tour was Rwanda's turn to host Nigeria.

The matches were played at the Gahanga International Cricket Stadium in Kigali. In a reverse of the previous series between the two sides, Rwanda won the series by 3 matches to 2.

Squads

WT20I series

1st WT20I

2nd WT20I

3rd WT20I

4th WT20I

5th WT20I

References

External links
 Series home at ESPN Cricinfo

Cricket in Rwanda
Cricket in Nigeria
Associate international cricket competitions in 2019–20